The Monuments Men is a 2014 war film directed by George Clooney and written and produced by Clooney and Grant Heslov. The film stars an ensemble cast including Clooney, Matt Damon, Bill Murray, John Goodman, Jean Dujardin, Bob Balaban, Hugh Bonneville, and Cate Blanchett.

The film is loosely based on the 2007 non-fiction book The Monuments Men: Allied Heroes, Nazi Thieves and the Greatest Treasure Hunt in History by Robert M. Edsel and Bret Witter. It follows an Allied group from the Monuments, Fine Arts, and Archives program that is given the task of finding and saving pieces of art and other culturally important items before Nazis destroy or steal them during World War II.

The Monuments Men was co-produced by Columbia Pictures (in association with 20th Century Fox) and Babelsberg Studio. It received mixed critical reviews and grossed $155 million worldwide against a $70 million budget.

Plot
In 1943, the Allies are making good progress driving back the Axis powers in Italy. Frank Stokes convinces President Roosevelt that victory will have little meaning if the artistic treasures of Western civilization are lost. Stokes is directed to assemble an Army unit nicknamed the "Monuments Men", comprising museum directors, curators, art historians, and an architect, to both guide Allied units and search for stolen art to return it to its rightful owners.

In July 1944, Claire Simone, a curator in occupied France, is forced to assist Nazi officer Viktor Stahl in overseeing the theft of art for either Adolf Hitler's Führermuseum or as personal property of senior commanders such as Hermann Göring. All seems lost when she discovers that Stahl is taking all of her gallery's contents to Germany as the Allies approach Paris. Simone runs to the railyard to confront him, but can only watch as he departs aboard the train carrying the cargo.

Stokes' unit finds its work frustrated by Allied officers in the field, who refuse to endanger their own troops for the sake of his mission. The unit splits up to cover more ground, with varying degrees of success. James Granger meets Simone, but she suspects the Americans want to confiscate the stolen art for their own country and refuses to cooperate. British officer Donald Jeffries sneaks into occupied Bruges at night to save Michelangelo's Madonna of Bruges, but is killed in the attempt.

Richard Campbell and Preston Savitz learn that Van Eyck's Ghent Altarpiece was removed by the priests of Ghent Cathedral for safekeeping, but their truck was stopped and the panels taken. Eventually, they find and arrest Viktor Stahl, who is hiding as a farmer, when they identify the paintings in his house as masterpieces, at least one stolen from the Rothschild Collection.

In December 1944, Walter Garfield and Jean Claude Clermont get lost in the countryside and blunder into a firefight. Clermont is mortally wounded and dies when Garfield is unable to find medical help. Meanwhile, Simone reconsiders when Granger shows her the Nero Decree, which orders the destruction of all German possessions if Hitler dies or Germany falls, and she sees him return a painting looted from a Jewish family to its rightful place in their empty home. She provides a comprehensive ledger she has compiled that provides valuable information on the stolen art and the rightful owners.

Even as the team learns that the artwork is being stored in various mines and castles, it also learns that it must now compete against the Soviet Union, which is seizing artwork from its occupation zone as war reparations. Meanwhile, Colonel Wegner is systematically destroying whole art caches. Eventually, the team has some success, as it discovers at least one mine hiding over 16,000 art pieces. In addition, the team captures the entire gold reserves of the Nazi German national treasury.

Finally, as the war ends in May 1945, the team finds a mine in Austria that appears to have been demolished, and the Soviets will be there in hours. Discovering that the entrances were actually blocked by the locals to prevent the Nazis from destroying the contents, the team evacuates as much artwork as possible, including sculptures, the Ghent Altarpiece, and the Madonna and Child, before the Soviets arrive.

Afterwards, Stokes reports back to President Truman that the team has recovered vast quantities of artwork and various other culturally significant items. As he requests to stay in Europe to oversee further searching and restoration, Truman asks Stokes if his efforts were worth the lives of the men he lost. Stokes says they were. Truman then asks if, thirty years from then, anyone will remember that these men died for a piece of art. In the final scene, set in 1977, the elderly Stokes replies "Yeah", while he takes his grandson to see Michelangelo's Bruges Madonna.

Cast
 George Clooney as Lieutenant Frank Stokes, loosely based on George L. Stout
 Nick Clooney plays an aged Stokes
 Matt Damon as Lieutenant James Granger, loosely based on James Rorimer
 Bill Murray as Sergeant Richard Campbell, loosely based on Ralph Warner Hammett and Robert K. Posey
 John Goodman as Sergeant Walter Garfield, loosely based on Walker Hancock
 Jean Dujardin as 2nd Lieutenant Jean-Claude Clermont
 Bob Balaban as Private Preston Savitz, loosely based on Lincoln Kirstein
 Hugh Bonneville as 2nd Lieutenant Donald Jeffries, loosely based on Ronald E. Balfour
 Cate Blanchett as Claire Simone, loosely based on Rose Valland
 Serge Hazanavicius as René Armand, loosely based on Jacques Jaujard
 Sam Hazeldine as Colonel Langton
 Dimitri Leonidas as Private Sam Epstein, loosely based on Harry L. Ettlinger
 Grant Heslov as the Army Field Surgeon
 Miles Jupp as Major Fielding
 Justus von Dohnányi as Viktor Stahl
 Holger Handtke as Colonel Wegner
 Zahari Baharov as Major Elya, a Red Army officer tasked with finding artworks stolen by the Nazis.

Production

A co-production between Columbia Pictures (in association with 20th Century Fox) and Germany's Studio Babelsberg, the film was funded by the German Federal Film Fund (DFFF) with €8.5 million, Mitteldeutsche Medienförderung, Medienboard Berlin-Brandenburg as well as Medien- und Filmgesellschaft Baden-Württemberg. Casting was held in February 2013 for thousands of extras for the military scenes.

Principal photography began in early March 2013, at the Babelsberg Studios in Potsdam, Germany, in the Berlin-Brandenburg region, and the Harz. The mines around Bad Grund, particularly the Wiemannsbucht and the Grube Hilfe Gottes, were used in the filming of outdoor scenes. Other outdoor locations were the towns of Lautenthal, Clausthal-Zellerfeld, Goslar, Halberstadt, Merseburg, and Osterwieck. Some of the scenes, including flights and American war base footage, were filmed at Imperial War Museum Duxford, Cambridgeshire, UK. A farm in Ashford in Kent was also used. Filming was scheduled to last until the end of June 2013, wrapping up in Rye, East Sussex.

Release
The film was originally set to be released on December 18, 2013, and a trailer was released on August 8, 2013. However, on October 22, 2013, the film was pushed back to February 2014, because issues balancing humor with the serious nature of the subject matter caused post-production to take longer than expected.

The film was screened on February 7, 2014, at the 64th Berlin International Film Festival. It was also screened at UNESCO, on 27 March 2014, on the occasion of the panel discussion "Modern Day Monuments Men and Women" on the preservation of heritage in times of conflict and the fight against the illicit trafficking of cultural property.

Reception
The Monuments Men received mixed reviews from film critics. On review aggregator Rotten Tomatoes, the film has a 30% approval rating, based on 254 reviews, with an average score of 5.2/10. The website's critical consensus reads, "Its intentions are noble and its cast is impressive, but neither can compensate for The Monuments Mens stiffly nostalgic tone and curiously slack narrative." On Metacritic, the film has a weighted average score of 52 out of 100, based on reviews from 43 critics, indicating "mixed or average reviews". Audiences surveyed by CinemaScore gave the film a grade "B+" on scale of A to F.

Peter Travers in Rolling Stone Magazine gave it 3 out of 4 stars, noting that while some of the dialogue and emotions seemed inauthentic, the physical production and cinematography were "exquisite," with shooting done on locations in Germany and England. In comparing the film with contemporary ones, he considered it a "proudly untrendy, uncynical movie," where the story involved people seeking something more valuable than money. He added, "Clooney [as director] feels there's much to be learned from these unsung art warriors...The Monuments Men is a movie about aspiration, about culture at risk, about things worth fighting for. I'd call that timely and well worth a salute." He also wrote that "...[e]scapism junkies may feel betrayed."

Richard Roeper from the Chicago Sun-Times called the film an "...engaging, shamelessly corny and entertaining World War II adventure inspired by true events"; he gave it a 3/4. Film critic Richard Corliss from TIME Magazine stated that "...[r]ather than juicing each element to blockbuster volume, Clooney has delivered it in the tone of a memorial lecture, warm and ambling, given by one of the distinguished academics he put in his movie."

Historian Alex von Tunzelmann, writing for The Guardian, noted several historical faults and said of the plot, "If you're getting the sense that the film is episodic and poorly structured, unfortunately you'd be right", and "There are far too many characters, so the screenplay splits them up into little groups and sends them off on various errands. Some of these are more exciting than others – but they do not add up to a satisfying plot. A TV series might have been a better vehicle for the "monuments men" stories than a feature film... The story is fascinating, but this film's good intentions are hampered by its lack of pace, direction, tone and properly fleshed-out characters."

Historical accuracy
The film is based on real events, but the names of all characters were changed, and a number of further adjustments were made to the historical facts in the interests of drama. Clooney is quoted as saying, "80 percent of the story is still completely true and accurate, and almost all of the scenes happened". The accounts of some events have, however, been altered to serve the film's dramatic portrayal of the retrieval of these treasures.

During the Nazi period, a huge number of European art treasures pillaged by the Germans had been stored in the Altaussee salt mine near the town of Bad Aussee. In the film, it is stated that 'local miners' had blown up the mine to prevent the contents being destroyed. In 1945 a British Special Operations Executive mission, codenamed Bonzos and led by Albrecht Gaiswinkler, was responsible for saving the looted art stored in Austrian salt mines. These personnel had been parachuted into the Aussee area, where he raised a force of around 300 men, armed them with captured German weapons, and spent the last weeks and months of the war harassing local German forces. When the Americans arrived, his information helped them capture several prominent Nazis. He and his colleagues had captured the salt mine, prevented the destruction of the artworks held there, and were able to hand over "a number of Nazi treasure hoards, including a good copy of the Mona Lisa (which is subject of debate)  and the Austrian Imperial Crown Jewels". Other artworks rescued included Hubert and Jan van Eyck's Ghent Altarpiece.

Nigel Pollard of Swansea University awarded the film only two stars out of five for historical accuracy. Pollard wrote, "There’s a kernel of history there, but The Monuments Men plays fast and loose with it in ways that are probably necessary to make the story work as a film, but the viewer ends up with a fairly confused notion of what the organisation Monuments, Fine Arts, and Archives program (MFAA) was, and what it achieved. The real organisation was never a big one (a few dozen officers at most), but the film reduces it to just seven men to personalise the hunt for the looted art: five Americans, one British officer, the first to be killed off (Hugh Bonneville), and a Free French officer, marginalising the British role in the establishment of the organisation. This is presented as set up at Clooney's [Stokes'] initiative after the bombing of Monte Cassino (so, after February 1944). In fact, its origins actually went back to British efforts in Libya in 1942, and it already existed (albeit with teething troubles) when the Allies invaded Sicily in July 1943."

See also
 Rescuing Da Vinci (2006 book)
 The Rape of Europa (1994 book and 2006 documentary film)
 The Train (1964 film)
 The Hessen Affair (2009 film)
Woman in Gold (2015 film)

References

External links

 
 
 
 
 
 Monuments Men book

2014 war drama films
2014 films
20th Century Fox films
American war drama films
German war drama films
World War II films based on actual events
Films based on non-fiction books
Art and cultural repatriation after World War II
Films set in 1977
Babelsberg Studio films
Columbia Pictures films
English-language German films
Films about the visual arts
Films directed by George Clooney
Films set in Austria
Films set in Bruges
Films set in Germany
Films set in Paris
Films set in 1943
Films set in 1944
Films set in 1945
Films shot in Germany
Monuments men
Films with screenplays by George Clooney
Films with screenplays by Grant Heslov
Smokehouse Pictures films
Films scored by Alexandre Desplat
Films produced by Grant Heslov
Films produced by George Clooney
2014 drama films
2010s English-language films
2010s American films
2010s German films